Hyposmocoma centronoma is a species of moth of the family Cosmopterigidae. It was first described by Edward Meyrick in 1935. It is endemic to the Hawaiian island of Oahu. The type locality is Kawaihapai.

The larvae feed on Metrosideros species.

External links

centronoma
Endemic moths of Hawaii
Moths described in 1935